The 1988 South African Open was a men's tennis tournament played on outdoor hard courts in Johannesburg, South Africa as part of the 1988 Nabisco Grand Prix. It was the 85th edition of the tournament and was held from 14 November through 20 November 1988. Second-seeded Jakob Hlasek won the singles title.

Finals

Singles
 Jakob Hlasek defeated  Christo van Rensburg 6–7, 6–4, 6–1, 7–6 
 It was Hlasek's 2nd singles title of the year and of his career.

Doubles
 Kevin Curren /  David Pate defeated  Gary Muller /  Tim Wilkison 7–6, 6–4

References

External links
 ATP tournament profile
 ITF tournament edition details

South African Open
South African Open (tennis)
Open
Sports competitions in Johannesburg
South African Open (tennis), 1988
South African Open (tennis)